Mark Andreas Cornelis Versfeld (born June 13, 1976) is a Canadian former competitive swimmer and backstroke specialist.  At the 2000 Summer Olympics, he finished in 26th position in the 100 m backstroke.  He won the same event and the 200 m backstroke two years earlier, at the 1998 Commonwealth Games.  At the 1998 Aquatic World Championships he won a silver in the 100-metre backstroke, and bronze in the 200-metre backstroke, breaking a Commonwealth record in the process.  He was named Canadian Male Aquatic Athlete of the Year in 1998.

Biography
Two years after his birth, his family moved to Fort McMurray where he started swimming in a club at age 8.  In 1981 his family relocated to Edmonton, and three years later to Calgary.  After the departure of his Calgary coach Deryk Snelling, Versfeld moved to Vancouver, where he trained under Tom Johnson with the University of British Columbia.  After mixed studies in the sciences, psychology and political science, he majored in Economics at the University of British Columbia.

In 2002 he retired from active swimming and in 2004 moved to Perth, Western Australia, where he took up surfing and swim coaching.  He was part of the winning team in the Rottnest 21-kilometre open-water relay swim in 2006, along with Australian Olympians Bill Kirby, Todd Pearson and Duncan Armstrong.

Family
His mother, Hella Rentema, is a former Olympic swimmer from the Netherlands. He has a sister, Kim, and a brother Niels, who is also a competitive swimmer.
His father Kees (Cornelis) won a Silver Medal in the 320+ age group relay at the FINA World Masters Swim Championships held in Montreal in 2014.

See also
 List of Commonwealth Games medallists in swimming (men)

References

1976 births
Living people
Canadian people of Dutch descent
Canadian male backstroke swimmers
Commonwealth Games gold medallists for Canada
Medalists at the FINA World Swimming Championships (25 m)
Olympic swimmers of Canada
Swimmers from Edmonton
Swimmers at the 1998 Commonwealth Games
Swimmers at the 1999 Pan American Games
Swimmers at the 2000 Summer Olympics
UBC Thunderbirds swimmers
World Aquatics Championships medalists in swimming
Commonwealth Games medallists in swimming
Pan American Games bronze medalists for Canada
Pan American Games medalists in swimming
Goodwill Games medalists in swimming
Competitors at the 2001 Goodwill Games
Medalists at the 1999 Pan American Games
Medallists at the 1998 Commonwealth Games